Novyye Bagazy (Yañı Bağaźı) is a rural locality (a village) in Askinsky Selsoviet, Askinsky District, Bashkortostan, Russia. The population was 277 as of 2010. There are 6 streets.

Geography 
Novyye Bagazy is located 33 km southeast of Askino (the district's administrative centre) by road. Matala is the nearest rural locality.

References 

Rural localities in Askinsky District